The 37th Annual Annie Awards, honoring the best in animation for 2009, were held on February 6, 2010, at Royce Hall in Los Angeles, California.

Production category nominees
Nominations announced on December 1, 2009

Best Animated Feature
 Up
 Cloudy with a Chance of Meatballs
 Coraline
 Fantastic Mr. Fox
 The Princess and the Frog
 The Secret of Kells

Best Home Entertainment Production
 Futurama: Into the Wild Green Yonder
 Curious George: A Very Monkey Christmas
 Green Lantern: First Flight
 Open Season 2
 SpongeBob SquarePants vs. The Big One

Best Animated Short Subject
 Robot Chicken: Star Wars 2.5 - shadowMachine
 Pups of Liberty - Picnic Pictures
 Santa, The Fascist Years - Plymptoons
 The Rooster, the Crocodile and the Night Sky -  Barley Films
 The Story of Walls - Badmash Animation Studios

Best Animated Television Commercial
 Spanish Lottery - "Deportees" - Acme Filmworks
 Goldfish - In the Dark
 Idaho Lottery - "Twiceland" - Acme Filmworks McDonald's - "Nutty Trade" - Blue Sky Studios
 The Spooning - Screen Novelties/Acne Media

Best Animated Television Production
 Prep and Landing - ABC Family/Walt Disney Animation Studios Glenn Martin, DDS - Tornante/Cuppa Coffee Studios/Rogers Communications
 Merry Madagascar - DreamWorks Animation
 The Simpsons - 20th Century Fox/Gracie Films

Best Animated Television Production for Children
 The Penguins of Madagascar - Nickelodeon Productions/DreamWorks Animation Mickey Mouse Clubhouse - Disney Television Animation
 SpongeBob SquarePants - Nickelodeon Productions
 The Marvelous Misadventures of Flapjack - Cartoon Network Studios
 The Mighty B! - Nickelodeon Productions/Polka Dot Pictures/Paper Kite Productions

Individual achievement category nominees

Animated Effects
 The Princess and the Frog - James Mansfield
 Cloudy with a Chance of Meatballs - Tom Kluyskens
 Monsters vs. Aliens - Scott Cegielski
 9 – Alexander Feigin
 Up - Eric Froemling

Character Animation in a Television Production
 Mark Donald - Bob's Big Break
 Mark Mitchell - Prep and Landing
 Kevan Shorey - Merry Madagascar
 Tony Smeed - Prep and Landing
 Philip To - Monsters vs Aliens: Mutant Pumpkins From Outer SpaceCharacter Design in a Feature Production
 Coraline – Shane Prigmore Coraline – Shannon Tindle
 Up – Daniel Lopez Munoz

Character Design in a Television Production
 Bill Schwab - Prep & Landing Benjamin Balistreri - Foster's Home for Imaginary Friends
 Bryan Arnett - The Mighty B
 Craig Kellman - Merry Madagascar

Directing in a Television Production
 Bret Haaland – The Penguins of Madagascar – Launchtime Pam Cooke, Jansen Yee – American Dad: Brains, Brains & Automobiles
 Rob Fendler – Popzilla
 John Infantino, J. G. Quintel – The Marvelous Misadventures of Flapjack: Candy Casanova
 Jennifer Oxley – The Wonder Pets: Help The Monster

Directing in a Feature Production
 Pete Docter – Up Phil Lord and Chris Miller – Cloudy with a Chance of Meatballs
 Henry Selick – Coraline
 Wes Anderson – Fantastic Mr. Fox
 Hayao Miyazaki – Ponyo on the Cliff by the Sea (Gake no ue no Ponyo)

Music in a Television Production

Music in a Feature Production
 Coraline – Bruno Coulais Ponyo on the Cliff by the Sea (Gake no ue no Ponyo) – Joe Hisaishi
 Ice Age: Dawn of the Dinosaurs – John Powell
 Up – Michael Giacchino

Production Design in a Television Production

Production Design in a Feature Production
 Coraline – Tadahiro Uesugi 9 – Christophe Vacher
 Coraline – Chris Appelhans
 The Princess and the Frog – Ian Gooding

Storyboarding in a Television Production

Storyboarding in a Feature Production

Voice Acting in a Television Production
 SpongeBob's Truth or Square - Tom Kenny Merry Madagascar - Danny Jacobs
 Chowder: The Dinner Theater - Nicky Jones
 Chowder: The Party Cruse - Dwight Schultz
 Merry Madagascar - Willow Smith

Voice Acting in a Feature Production
 The Princess and the Frog - Jennifer Cody Coraline - Dawn French
 Monsters vs. Aliens - Hugh Laurie
 Ice Age: Dawn of the Dinosaurs - John Leguizamo
 The Princess and the Frog - Jenifer Lewis

Writing in a Television Production

Writing in a Feature Production
 Fantastic Mr. Fox – Wes Anderson and Noah Baumbach' Astro Boy – David Bowers and Timothy Harris
 Cloudy with a Chance of Meatballs – Phil Lord and Christopher Miller
 Up'' – Pete Docter, Tom McCarthy and Bob Peterson

Juried award winners
 Special Achievement: Martin Meunier and Brian McLean
 Winsor McCay Award: Tim Burton, Bruce Timm, Jeffrey Katzenberg
 Ub Iwerks Award: William Reeves
 June Foray Award: Tom Sito
 Certificate of Merit: Myles Mikulic, Danny Young, and Michael Woodside

References

2009
2009 film awards
Annie
Annie